The Albany Presbyterian Church and Rectory, also known as Whitespires, is a historic church building in Albany, Oregon, United States. It was built in 1891 in the Carpenter Gothic style. It was listed on the National Register of Historic Places (NRHP) in 1979. Although individually listed in the NRHP, it is located within the  Monteith Historic District.

Whitespires houses a Kimball pipe organ that was installed in 1906.

The building is currently the home of the Whitespires Berean Bible Fellowship, also known as Berean Fundamental Church of Albany.

The present-day United Presbyterian congregation in Albany (affiliated with the Presbyterian Church (U.S.A.)) gathers in a 1913 church known as the Stone Church.

References

External links

Images of Whitespires from University of Oregon Library archives
History of the church from Linn County Roots

1891 establishments in Oregon
19th-century Presbyterian church buildings in the United States
Buildings and structures in Albany, Oregon
Carpenter Gothic church buildings in Oregon
Churches completed in 1891
Churches on the National Register of Historic Places in Oregon
Culture of Albany, Oregon
Individually listed contributing properties to historic districts on the National Register in Oregon
National Register of Historic Places in Linn County, Oregon
Presbyterian churches in Oregon